Major-General Rowland Broughton Mainwaring  (11 September 1850 – 22 November 1926) was a senior British Army officer.

Military career
Educated at Marlborough College, Mainwaring was commissioned into the 23rd Regiment of Foot on 30 January 1878. He saw action in the Third Anglo-Ashanti War in 1873, the Third Anglo-Burmese War in 1885 and the Bhanio Mogoumg expedition in 1886 as well as the Hazara expedition in 1891. He became commanding officer of the 2nd Battalion Royal Welch Fusiliers, which he commanded in Crete, for which service he was appointed a Companion of the Order of St Michael and St George, and then took part in the Second Boer War in 1899. He went on to serve as commander of the 23rd Regimental District from 1900 to 1906 and as General Officer Commanding 68th (2nd Welsh) Division from January 1915 to November 1915.

Works

References

1850 births
1926 deaths
British Army generals of World War I
Companions of the Order of St Michael and St George
Royal Welch Fusiliers officers
People educated at Marlborough College
British Army major generals
British Army personnel of the Second Boer War
Military personnel from Staffordshire